Harmonisation or harmonize may refer to:

Music
 Harmonization, in music, the implementation of harmony, usually by using chords, including harmonized scales
 Harmonize (singer), (born 1994), a Tanzanian musician
 Last verse harmonisation, a technique of hymn accompaniment used by church organists

Law
 Harmonisation of law, the process of establishing common laws, treaties and standards
 Maximum harmonisation, a term used in European Union law, indicates a level that national law may not go beyond
 Minimum harmonisation, a term used in European Union law, indicates a threshold which national legislation must meet
 Tax harmonization, a process of adjusting tax systems of different jurisdictions in the pursuit of a common policy objective

Standards
 Harmonization (standards), the process of minimizing redundant or conflicting standards which may have evolved independently
 Standardization
 International standardization

Other
 Gospel harmony, an attempt to compile the canonical gospels of the Christian New Testament into a single account
 Gun harmonisation, the aiming of fixed guns or cannon carried in the wings of a fighter aircraft
 Socialist Harmonious Society, Chinese leader Hu Jintao's signature ideology
 Harmonious and River crab (Internet slang), internet slang created by Chinese netizens, referring to censorship